Bishop is an extinct town in Whitman County, in the U.S. state of Washington.

A post office called Bishop was established in 1913, and remained in operation until 1925. The community was named after the Bishop brothers, local settlers.

References

Ghost towns in Washington (state)
Geography of Whitman County, Washington